The Town of Bayfield is a Statutory Town located in La Plata County, Colorado, United States. The town population was 2,838 at the 2020 United States Census, a +21.65% increase since the 2010 United States Census. Bayfield is  part of the Durango, CO Micropolitan Statistical Area.

History
The town derives its name from W.A. Bay, founder.

On January 19, 1988, Trans-Colorado Airlines Flight 2286 crashed in Bayfield, killing nine of the 17 people aboard.

Geography
Bayfield is located at  (37.230532, -107.599539), along U.S. Highway 160.

Demographics

As of the census of 2000, there were 1,549 people, 567 households, and 409 families residing in the town. The racial makeup of the town was 91.67% White, 0.19% African American, 2.13% Native American, 0.13% Asian, 3.36% from other races, and 2.52% from two or more races. Hispanic or Latino of any race were 10.46% of the population.

There were 567 households, out of which 43.2% had children under the age of 18 living with them, 59.3% were married couples living together, 8.6% had a female householder with no husband present, and 27.7% were non-families. 22.8% of all households were made up of individuals, and 6.0% had someone living alone who was 65 years of age or older.  The average household size was 2.71 and the average family size was 3.19.

In the town, the population was spread out, with 31.2% under the age of 18, 7.4% from 18 to 24, 30.0% from 25 to 44, 23.8% from 45 to 64, and 7.5% who were 65 years of age or older.  The median age was 35 years. For every 100 females, there were 98.3 males.  For every 100 females age 18 and over, there were 92.9 males.

The median income for a household in the town was $39,336, and the median income for a family was $46,583. Males had a median income of $34,464 versus $22,027 for females. The per capita income for the town was $17,324.  About 2.9% of families and 5.6% of the population were below the poverty line, including 3.8% of those under age 18 and 7.9% of those age 65 or over.

See also

Colorado
Bibliography of Colorado
Index of Colorado-related articles
Outline of Colorado
List of counties in Colorado
List of municipalities in Colorado
List of places in Colorado
List of statistical areas in Colorado
Durango, CO Micropolitan Statistical Area
Spring Creek Archeological District, a Basketmaker and Pueblo site near Bayfield

References

External links

Town of Bayfield website
CDOT map of the Town of Bayfield

Towns in La Plata County, Colorado
Towns in Colorado